The Directorate-General for Economic and Financial Affairs (DG ECFIN) is a Directorate-General of the European Commission. The DG ECFIN is located in Brussels, Belgium, and Luxembourg. Its main responsibility is to encourage the development of Economic and Monetary Union both inside and outside the European Union, by advancing economic policy coordination, conducting economic surveillance and providing policy assessment and advice.

Policy areas

The Directorate-General's policy areas include:
 Economic surveillance (euro area and EU) 
 Monitoring of the economy of the euro area and of the EU 
 Key indicators 
 Economic forecasts (spring and autumn) 
 Business and consumer surveys 
 Annual Review on the EU economy 
 Convergence reports 
 Monitoring budgetary policy and public finances 
 Stability and Growth Pact (SGP) and fiscal surveillance 
 Annual « Public Finance Report » 
 Contribution of public finances to economic growth and employment 
 The consequences of ageing 
 Economic policy coordination 
 BEPG (Broad Economic Policy Guidelines, described as the EU's Stability and Growth Pact) (incl. Implementation report) 
 Structural reforms 
 Luxembourg, Cardiff and Cologne processes 
 Assessing the policy-mix in the euro area 
 The euro: legal, practical and institutional aspects 
 Legal and institutional issues of the euro 
 Euro coins 
 Update and maintenance of the Commission's euro web site 
 Financial markets and capital movement 
 Integration of EU financial markets 
 Freedom of capital movements 
 Economic relations with third countries 
 Accession countries: economic aspects of enlargement 
 G7 Countries 
 Russia 
 Western Balkan Countries, Mediterranean Countries, and development issues 
 Macro-financial assistance to third countries 
 Relations with international financial institutions (International Monetary Fund, World Bank, EBRD,...) 
 Financing 
 Investment Financing 
 EIB
 EIF
 Funding Programmes for SMEs 
 Funding for Trans-European Networks 
 Euratom loans 
 Opinions and surveys on investments for the European Coal and Steel Community (ECSC)

See also
European Commissioner for Economy
Economic and Monetary Union of the European Union
Economy of the European Union
General Agreement on Tariffs and Trade (GATT)
United Nations Monetary and Financial Conference (Bretton Woods)

External links
 Homepage of ECFIN

According to its copyright policy, reproduction is authorised, provided the source is acknowledged.

Economic and Financial Affairs